Dyschirius bacillus is a species of ground beetle in the subfamily Scaritinae. It was described by Hermann Rudolph Schaum in 1857.

References

bacillus
Beetles described in 1857
Taxa named by Hermann Rudolph Schaum